Odo Otin is a local government area in Osun State, Nigeria. Its headquarters are in the town of Okuku.

It has an area of 294 km and a population of 134,110 as of the 2006 Nigerian census.

The LGA takes its name from the Otin River, which traverses it.

References

Local Government Areas in Osun State